Sladenia integrifolia is a species of tree in the family Sladeniaceae found in southern Yunnan, China. Its type locality is Zhemi Township, Jinping Miao, Yao, and Dai Autonomous County, southern Yunnan, China.

Description
It is found in secondary evergreen forests at 1000–1300 m above sea level. Sladenia integrifolia flowers from March to June. Fruiting occurs from July to December.

References

Sladeniaceae
Trees of China
Flora of Yunnan